Pouic-Pouic is a French comedy film from 1963, directed by Jean Girault, written by Jean Girault and Jacques Vilfrid, starring Louis de Funès. The film is known under the titles: "Casamento a Propósito" (Portugal), "El pollo de mi mujer" (Spain), "Quietsch... quietsch... wer bohrt denn da nach Öl" (West Germany), "I 3 affari del signor Duval" (Italy).

Cast 
 Louis de Funès : Léonard Monestier
 Mireille Darc : Patricia Monestier
 Jacqueline Maillan : Cynthia Monestier
 Roger Dumas : Paul Monestier
Maria-Rosa Rodriguez (called Yana Chouri) : Régine Mercier alias Palma Diamantino
 Philippe Nicaud : Simon Guilbaud
 Guy Tréjean : Antoine Brévin
 Christian Marin : Charles
 Daniel Ceccaldi : Pedro Caselli
 Philippe Dumat : Morrison
 Yves Barsacq : James
 Jean Girault : bald player in the grant
 Pierre Bouteiller : voice on radio

References

External links 
 
 Pouic-Pouic (1963) at the Films de France

1963 films
French comedy films
1960s French-language films
French black-and-white films
Films directed by Jean Girault
Universal Pictures films
1960s French films